The Pensacola Ladies Invitational was a golf tournament on the LPGA Tour from 1965 to 1968. It was played at the Scenic Hills Country Club in Pensacola, Florida.

Winners
Pensacola Ladies Invitational
1968 Kathy Whitworth
1967 Mickey Wright
1966 Sandra Haynie

Pensacola Invitational
1965 Betsy Rawls

References

External links
Tournament results at Golfobserver.com

Former LPGA Tour events
Golf in Florida
Women's sports in Florida
Sports in Pensacola, Florida